Mazerat-Aurouze is a commune in the Haute-Loire department in south-central France.

Geography
The Senouire flows southwest, then northwest, through the commune; most of the hamlets lie in its valley.

Population

See also
Communes of the Haute-Loire department

References

Communes of Haute-Loire